Air Chief Marshal Frank Robert Miller  (April 30, 1908 – October 20, 1997) was a Canadian airman, the last Chairman of the Chiefs of Staff Committee in 1964, the first chief of the Defence Staff from 1964 until 1966, and deputy minister of National Defence. He held a range of Air Force training appointments during World War II.

Military career
Frank Robert Miller was born in Kamloops, British Columbia, on April 30, 1908, to Hedley Miller and his wife Mary.  After completing his education at the University of Alberta (where he gained a BSc) Miller joined the Royal Canadian Air Force at Camp Borden on September 15, 1931, with the rank of pilot officer. He received his wings on December 16 and was promoted to flying officer. Miller then underwent further training before becoming an instructor at the Camp Borden flying and navigation school in 1935. Promoted to flight lieutenant on September 1, 1937, he taught at the  Air Navigation and Seaplane School, Trenton from May 1937 to September 1938. In September 1938, Miller was posted to England to attend the Specialist Air Navigation Course at the School of Air Navigation, RAF Manston, during which time he was promoted to squadron leader on April 1, 1939. At the outbreak of war in September, Miller was the Officer Commanding of the Air Navigation and Reconnaissance School, Trenton. He was promoted to acting wing commander in December 1940. From May 1942 Miller commanded the Air Navigation School at Rivers, Manitoba. Promoted to acting group captain in July, he commanded the General Reconnaissance School on Prince Edward Island before moving to the Air Force Headquarters in January 1943 where he served as Director of Training Plans and Requirements. He was promoted to acting air commodore in January 1943.

In 1944 Miller was posted to England and on September 19 he took up command of RAF Bomber Command's No. 61 Base in North Yorkshire, with the substantive rank of air commodore from October 14.  No 61 Base was headquartered at Topcliffe and commanded the RAF establishments at Dalton, Dishforth, and Wombleton. On November 9 Millar's command was redesignated No. 76 Base and Gamston in Nottinghamshire was added as a subordinate unit.  On January 13, 1945, Miller took up command of No. 63 Base which was responsible for RAF Leeming (headquarters) and RAF Skipton-on-Swale.

After the war, Miller served in several senior positions in the Royal Canadian Air Force.  In September 1951, Miller was promoted to vice-chief of the Air Staff with the rank of air vice-marshal, serving until 1954. He was then posted to Supreme Headquarters Allied Powers Europe as General Lauris Norstad’s Vice-Deputy Air.  Gaining promotion to air marshal in 1955 he then retired from the RCAF at Prime Minister Louis St. Laurent's request to serve in the senior civil service position of deputy minister of National Defence, remaining in post until 1957. He then became Deputy Commander-in-Chief NORAD. In 1960, he was appointed Chairman of the Chiefs of Staff Committee, gaining promotion to air chief marshal on September 1, 1961.  Three years later he became the first chief of the Defence Staff, serving from 1964 until 1966. As chief of the Defence Staff, Miller was opposed to the plans of the Defence Minister Paul Hellyer to merge the Royal Canadian Air Force, the Royal Canadian Navy and the Canadian Army into one service, and in 1966 resigned in protest, saying he could not in good conscience co-operate with Hellyer's plans.

In 1972 Miller was made a Companion of the Order of Canada.  He died on October 20, 1997.

Academic qualifications
 Bachelor of Science (BSc)
 Doctor of Laws (LLD)

Notes

References

External links
 Order of Canada Citation
 Frank Robert Miller  at The Canadian Encyclopedia

|-

|-

|-

|-

|-

|-

|-

|-

|-

|-

1908 births
1997 deaths
Canadian military personnel from British Columbia
Chiefs of the Defence Staff (Canada)
Canadian Commanders of the Order of the British Empire
Companions of the Order of Canada
People from Kamloops
Royal Canadian Air Force air marshals
Royal Canadian Air Force personnel of World War II